The Jerusalem Marathon is an annual marathon running event held in Jerusalem during the month of March. The course begins at Israel's parliament (the Knesset), passes through Mount Scopus and the Old City, and finishes at Sacher Park. The course record in the men's category was set in 2014 by Kenyan runner Ronald Kimeli Kurgat, and the course record in the women's category was set in 2016 by Kenyan runner Joan Jepchirchir Kigen.

Races at shorter distances and a fun run are held in conjunction with the marathon.

The 2022 edition took place on 25 March. Ageze Guadie, from Israel, was the winner of the men's race, in 2:37:17, and Valentina Versca, of Ukraine, and a refugee from the Russian invasion of Ukraine, was the winner of the women's race in 2:45:54.

The next edition is scheduled for 17 March 2023.

History
Prior to the formation of the current event in 2011, a Jerusalem Marathon was staged for three years running between 1992 and 1994.  Half-marathon races were held in the city after that and a subsequent push from Jerusalem mayor Nir Barkat resulted in the re-establishment of an international standard marathon in the city.

The marathon was reestablished in March 2011 and drew 10,000 participants from 40 countries. That year, the three leading runners in the men's race veered off course and arrived at the wrong finish line.

The 2012 event, which drew 15,000 runners including 1,500 from 50 countries outside Israel, was marked by rain, strong winds, and pounding hail.

In 2013, twenty thousand runners from 54 countries participated in the third Jerusalem Marathon. The Palestine Liberation Organization called for participants and sponsors to boycott the race in 2013.

In 2014, the number of participants rose to over 25,000.

The 2020 edition of the race was cancelled due to the coronavirus pandemic, with all registrants given the option of transferring their entry to 2021 or obtaining a refund.

Course 

The starting point of the marathon is Israel's parliament, the Knesset, in the western part of the city. Runners thence loop around the Giv'at Ram campus of the Hebrew University of Jerusalem, pass alongside the Valley of the Cross, and cross through various neighborhoods on their way up to Hebrew University's Mount Scopus campus in eastern Jerusalem. The route then descends to the Old City, taking runners through Jaffa Gate and the Armenian Quarter and out Zion Gate, on their way to the Jerusalem Forest. The race's finishing point is Sacher Park. Jerusalem's hilly terrain makes the marathon especially challenging.

Winners 

Key: Course record (in bold)

Initial era

Current era

Other records 

 Fastest Israeli man: 2:32:31, Asrat Mamo, 2011
 Fastest Israeli woman: 3:09:50, Beatie Deutsch, 2018
 Men's half marathon course record: 1:05:55, Onesmus Serem, Kenya, 2011
 Women's half marathon course record: 1:18:00, Margaret Njuguna Wangui, Kenya, 2016
 Fastest Israeli in the half marathon course: 1:08:45, Godadaw Belachew, 2019
 Fastest Israeli woman in the half marathon course: 1:21:47, Beatie Deutsch, 2019
 Men's 10 km course record: 31:19, Haimro Alame, Israel, 2013
 Women's 10 km course record: 37:31, Lonah Chemtai Salpeter, Israel, 2016

See also 

Tel Aviv Marathon
Tiberias Marathon
List of marathon races in Asia
Sport in Israel

Notes

References

External links 
 Jerusalem marathon 2012 in pictures (The Guardian)
 Ready, set, run! (The Jerusalem Post)
 Running in Jerusalem Marathon helps S.F. artist gain clarity (Jweekly)
 Survivor who escaped Nazis runs Jerusalem Marathon (Yahoo! News/AP)
 "My vocal epiphany racing in the Holy Land" – Ben Kaplan (National Post)
 Reporter's Notebook: More than just a race – Melanie Lidman (The Jerusalem Post)
 Despite the weather, Vancouverite finishes run – Fred Tischler (The Jewish Independent)
 Egyptian-American man sends a message while running last week's Jerusalem marathon (Public Radio International)

Marathons in Israel
Sport in Jerusalem
Recurring sporting events established in 2011
Annual sporting events in Israel